The 2020 Charlotte Independence season was the club's sixth season of existence, and their sixth in the USL Championship (USLC), the second tier of American soccer.  This article covers the period from November 18, 2019, the day after the 2019 USLC Playoff Final, to the conclusion of the 2020 USLC Playoff Final, scheduled for November 12–16, 2020.

Review

Pre-season
In December, the club and Mecklenburg County broke ground on renovations to American Legion Memorial Stadium that will upgrade the facility and create a home ground for the Independence through a ten-year lease, with the opening scheduled for Spring of 2021. In January, the club announced that they were retaining seven players from the previous year's roster, while also acknowledging that longtime club presence Alex Martínez would not be among the returnees. Later signings in January included a Congolese midfielder with Ligue 2 experience at AS Béziers (Junior Etou), the 2017 USLC Golden Boot winner Dane Kelly, as well as two rookies (Oscar Ramsay and Casey Penland) from the team's Invitational Combine.

Acquisitions continued apace in February as the club signed a veteran defender (Duke Lacroix), a UNC Charlotte alum with Championship goalkeeping experience (Austin Pack), and a former loanee winger (Derek Gebhard). The club then announced the signing of two of the club's academy players, (Owen Barber) and (Joey Skinner), to professional contracts. A player with U-15 USMNT experience, Rey Ortiz, was brought in from FC Cincinnati on a season-long loan. The next addition was Guido Vadalá, a 23-year-old forward with first-team experience at Argentinian club Boca Juniors.

On the minus side, the club announced the retirement of veteran Charlotte forward Jorge Herrera.

March
Charlotte began their 2020 campaign with a 2–1 victory on the road versus Sporting Kansas City II. In response to the COVID-19 pandemic, the league suspended play for 30 days beginning March 12. On March 19, the suspension was further extended to May 10.

June
On June 4, the league announced a tentative date of July 11 for a resumption of play. Later, the league announced that upon resumption of play, teams would be separated into eight regional groups and play enough matches to complete a 16-game schedule. On June 26, the league announced that Charlotte was to be placed into Group G with other regional clubs including Birmingham, Memphis, and North Carolina.

July
Charlotte began their Return To Play action with a 2–2 draw away to Memphis, recovering twice from single goal deficits to bring the match level. The draw was sandwiched by postponements to matches away in Miami and home versus North Carolina.

August
The Independence began the month with a 4-1 loss away to Birmingham. The team failed to score from open play, with their lone goal coming from a penalty conversion by Enzo Martínez. That loss was followed up by successive 1-1 draws, the first on the 8th versus Charleston in the club's home opener, followed by the second draw on the 12th of the month against Birmingham. The team finished the three-game homestand with a 3-2 victory over Memphis, their first home win of the season. The team then traveled to Miami for an out-of-group match that resulted in a 2-1 loss. The Jacks completed the month with a two-game homestand. In the first match, the team secured a 1-0 win on the first professional goal scored by Rey Ortiz. The team finished the month as they started it, with a 4-1 loss to Birmingham. The Jacks conceded four unanswered goals before Dane Kelly netted his fifth goal of the season in the 85th minute.

September
The Independence began a busy month with a 2-0 win on the road versus Memphis. The win solidified the club's hold on second place in Group G, five points clear of third place. The club followed up that performance with a 3-1 home win against North Carolina. The sum total of the Independence scoring consisted of a Dane Kelly hat trick. The club then went on the road to score a 3-1 win over Group G leading Birmingham. The Jacks, aided a brace of goals from Dane Kelly, moved within one point of Birmingham in the standings. Staying on the road, the Independence scored another victory, this time over North Carolina. Despite being down to 10 men at the time by way of a Dane Kelly straight red card, Aaron Maund headed home the only goal of the match in the 51st minute to secure the club's first away win against NCFC.

The Jacks returned home four days later to face Miami FC. The point the club earned in the scoreless draw moved the Independence into a tie with Birmingham atop the Group G standings. The Independence then suffered their first loss of the month, falling 3-1 at home versus Memphis.

October
The Jacks secured the top spot in Group G thanks to a 1-0 road win versus North Carolina coupled with a Memphis victory over Birmingham on October 3. The Independence were then eliminated from the postseason in their opening conference quarterfinal match hosting Charleston Battery. The Jacks finished regulation time in a 1-1 deadlock, then conceded a headed goal by Arthur Bosua in the 101st minute.

Club

Current roster
As of March 4, 2020

Competitions

Exhibitions

USL Championship

Standings — Group G

Match results
On December 20, 2019, the USL announced the 2020 season schedule, creating the following fixture list for the early part of Charlotte's season.

As part of the resumption of league play, the following schedule was announced for Charlotte on July 2, 2020.

USL Cup Playoffs

U.S. Open Cup 

As a USL Championship club, the Independence will enter the competition in the Second Round, to be played April 7–9.

Statistics 
 Source: us.soccerway.com

Numbers after plus-sign(+) denote appearances as a substitute.

Appearances and goals

|-
|}

References

Charlotte Independence seasons
Charlotte
Charlotte Independence
Charlotte